Middle School: The Worst Years of My Life is a realistic fiction novel by James Patterson that serves as the beginning of Patterson's Middle School series. Published in the United States by Little, Brown and Company on June 27, 2011, the book follows sixth grader Rafe Khatchadorian as he begins middle school and "copes with the awkwardness of adolescence: crushes, bullying, family issues" as he attempts to break every school rule in the code of conduct. The book received critical acclaim from many reviewers and went on to spawn a sequel, Middle School: Get Me Out of Here!.

Plot

Rafe is bored at Hills Village Middle School with sixth grade at first, but he and his friend Leonardo the Silent invent "Operation R.A.F.E." (stands for "rules aren't for everyone"), a challenge to break every rule in his middle school handbook.  He also deals with problems at home. His mother constantly works double shifts at a Swifty's Diner and barely gets to see Rafe and his sister Georgia. He has a verbally abusive stepfather-to-be named Carl (aka Bear), who "watches" over him when his mother is not home. He finds consolation in Jeanne Galletta, who is skeptical of Operation R.A.F.E. and encourages him to work on his schoolwork. Miller, also known as Miller the Killer, the school bully, stole Rafe's journal that had drawings and Operation R.A.F.E inside. Miller refused to give Rafe his journal back unless he pays $1 per page. After getting expelled for fighting Miller before a parent-teacher conference, Rafe decides to perform one final act, and proceeds to paint a mural across the entirety of the school exterior, though he is taken in by police after he finishes. When he arrives back home, Bear physically hits Jules, knocking her down and causing Rafe to yell at him, and he and his family are taken by the police. By the end of the book, after a suggestion from his English teacher, Ms. Donatello, Rafe is preparing to head to Air Brook Academy, an art school.

Characters
 Raphael "Rafe" Khatchadorian – The main character of the story is a sixth-grader at Hills Village Middle School who does not have many friends aside from Leo the silent.
 Leonardo the Silent – Rafe's quiet, imaginary friend who gets Rafe into trouble. Rather than being a figment of fantasy, like most imaginary friends, Leo the Silent was originally a real person – Rafe's twin brother, Leonardo, who died of meningitis in the book and cancer in the movie when he and Rafe were younger. 
 Georgia Khatchadorian – Rafe's adopted younger sister who occasionally quarrels with her brother and often acts as the family tattletale whenever she hears a secret. Jules adopted her after Leo died, explaining why Georgia has no similarities in looks to her mother.
 Jeanne Galletta – One of Rafe's only friends, and crush, at HVMS. She also tutors Rafe. 
 Miller the Killer – The school bully. He thinks Rafe is using Operation R.A.F.E. to threaten his status as the biggest troublemaker in school. He eventually pushes Rafe to a point where he beats him up (this happens towards the end of the book).
 Jules Khatchadorian – Rafe and Georgia's mother. A character attributed for making Rafe quit his game in the middle of the story. She is divorced.
 Carl "Bear" – Jules' abusive, lazy fiancé, from whom she ends up parting. 
 Ms. Donatello "Dragon Lady" – A teacher of HVMS who seems nasty at first, but turns out to be nice and helps Rafe.
James Patterson – An older version of Rafe. Also the author.

Accomplishments

Praise
"The book's ultra short chapters, dynamic artwork, and message that ‘normal is boring’ should go  to kids who don't fit in the mold that there's a place for them, too." – Publishers Weekly

"As Patterson artfully weaves a deeper and more thought-provoking tale of childhood coping mechanisms and everyday school and family realities, readers are drawn into a deeper understanding of and compassion for the main characters." – School Library Journal

"Incredibly detailed and imaginative illustrations... add depth and humor.... an enjoyable story that even the most reluctant readers should enjoy." – Library Media Connection

Awards
The book was named a Young Adult Library Services Association (YALSA) 2012 Top Ten Quick Picks for Reluctant Young Readers award.

Based on Middle School’s success James Patterson was nominated for the Children's Book Council's Author of the Year award.

Commercial success
Middle School, The Worst Years of My Life was a No. 1 The New York Times best-seller and a No. 1 Indiebound best-seller. It was also made into an audiobook by Chivers Children's CDs.

Sequels
Middle School: Get Me Out of Here! was published on May 7, 2012. It follows Rafe in his new art school as he trades Operation: R.A.F.E. for Operation: Get a Life. It also featured a sneak peek at Patterson's new novel I Funny which almost serves as the series' spiritual successor in terms of style. In Middle School: The Worst Years of My Life there are the first 17 pages of Middle School: Get Me Out of Here. 

On March 18, 2013, another book, this time about Georgia, Rafe's little sister, called Middle School: My Brother is a Big, Fat Liar, was released. 

On June 24, 2013, another book called Middle School: How I Survived Bullies, Broccoli, and Snake Hill was released. 

After that, another book called Middle School: Ultimate Showdown was released, which did not have a story base. It was more of an activity book. 

The story returned with Middle School: Save Rafe!, and was succeeded by Middle School: Just My Rotten Luck, Middle School: Rafe’s Aussie Adventure, Middle School: Dog's Best Friend, Middle School: Escape to Australia, Middle School: From Hero to Zero, Middle School: Born to Rock, Middle School: Master of Disaster, Middle School: Field Trip Fiasco and Middle School: It’s a Zoo In Here.

Film adaptation

A film adaptation was released by CBS Films in October 2016. Griffin Gluck played Rafe Khatchadorian.

References

External links

 James Patterson's Middle School books
 James Patterson official website

American children's novels
Young adult novels by James Patterson
2011 American novels
Novels set in high schools and secondary schools
American novels adapted into films
2011 children's books